The Church of Our Lady St Mary of Glastonbury in Glastonbury, Somerset, England, is a Roman Catholic church that was completed in 1940.

History
The church sits along Magdalene Street facing the medieval Abbot's Kitchen across the road in Glastonbury Abbey. On the same site once stood the original Catholic church in an old converted stable, which was pulled down in 1938. Behind the church there was once the St Louis Convent school, which operated from 1925 until 1984. The new church was made at a cost of £11,000 and was built using Bath and Corsham stone. At the front of the church, carved into the stone ,are statues of the Madonna and Child, Saint Dunstan to the left and Richard Whiting, the last abbot of Glastonbury, on the right. Father Michael Fitzpatrick worked on raising these funds and relied upon local donations to do so.

Relics

After its consecration on July 2, 1941, by Bishop Lee of Clifton, the church was blessed and relics from saints placed within the altar and reliquaries from:

Oliver Plunkett – Patron saint of peace and reconciliation in Ireland
Thomas Becket – Patron saint of the Roman Catholic Secular Clergy
Pope Innocent I – Once pope for 16 years
Benedict of Nursia – Patron saint of students and the dying, et al.
Victoria of Albitina – Patron of Anticoli, Italy
Saint Barbara – Patron saint of artillerymen and miners
Pope Clement I – Patron saint of stone cutters and sailors

Interior

Behind the altar is the statue of Our Lady St Mary of Glastonbury, which was executed in 1955. Either side is a large tapestry which was woven by the Edinburgh Tapestry Company. It depicts the three Glastonbury Martyrs – Abbot Richard Whiting, his treasurer John Thorne and their companion Roger James – before they were hanged, drawn and quartered at Glastonbury Tor during the Dissolution of the Monasteries. Also depicted are Saints Dunstan, Patrick, Brigid, Joseph of Arimathea, and David, and the monk Richard Bere who was beheaded for refusing to "take the Oath of Henry's supremacy over the Church".

Above the tapestry is a stained glass window depicting the Crucifixion with Mary Magdalene at the feet of Jesus. On the left is the Virgin Mary and on the right is Saint John, a disciple of Jesus.

List of priests
Fr Francis Burdett, 1926–1928 
Fr Patrick O'Beirne, 1929–1938
Fr Michael Fitzpatrick, 1938–1944
Fr William Ryan, 1944–1948
Fr Joseph Sheehan, 1948–1952
Fr James O'Brien, 1952–1962
Fr Sean McNamara, 1962–1967
Fr John O'Connor, 1968–1982
Fr Nicholas Tranter, 1982–1984
Fr Paul Sankey, 1984–1998
Fr Kevin Knox-Lecky, 1999–2012
Fr James Finan, 2012–2017
Fr Bede Rowe, 2017–2019
The Community of Our Lady of Glastonbury, 2019–2021
Fr Dominic Findlay-Wilson, 2021–present

References

Glastonbury
Roman Catholic churches in Somerset